Apples and oranges is an idiom comparing apples and oranges.

Apples and oranges may also refer to:
 "Apples and Oranges" (song), a 1967 song by Pink Floyd
 Apples & Oranges, an album by Postmen
 Apples & Oranges, a 2007 album by Stacy Clark
 Apples & Oranges, a play by Alfred Uhry
 "Appels + Oranjes", a song by The Smashing Pumpkins from Adore
 Apples and Oranges, painting by Paul Cézanne

See also
 Apples and Pears (disambiguation)